Dancers Onstage (French - Danseuses sur la scène) is an 1889 oil on canvas painting by Edgar Degas, now in the Musée des Beaux-Arts de Lyon.

Theme 
Degas is the painter of dancers because of the large number of works he devoted to this subject during the period 1860–1890.

References

External links

Paintings by Edgar Degas
1889 paintings
Paintings in the collection of the Museum of Fine Arts of Lyon
Dance in art